Yukarı Kuledibi (formerly: Sundura) is a quarter of the town Hopa, Hopa District, Artvin Province, Turkey. Its population is 505 (2021). Most inhabitants of the neighbourhood are ethnically Laz.

References

Hopa District
Laz settlements in Turkey